The Aeronca Model 9 Arrow was a low-wing all-metal cabin monoplane with retractable landing gear. It was marketed to returning pilots from World War II and unveiled in 1947 but never went into production.

The single prototype (registered NX39581) was destroyed in a crash during a test flight due to propeller failure.

Specifications

See also

References

Further reading

External links
 Aerofiles: Aeronca 9 Arrow

Low-wing aircraft
Single-engined tractor aircraft
1940s United States civil utility aircraft
Aeronca aircraft
Aircraft first flown in 1947